Formal logic in China has a special place in the history of logic due to its length of and relative isolation to the strong ancient adoption and continued current of development of the study of logic in Europe, India, and the Islamic world.

Mohist logic

In China, a contemporary of Confucius, Mozi, "Master Mo", is credited with founding the Mohist school,
whose canons dealt with issues relating to valid inference and the conditions of correct conclusions.  However, they were nonproductive and not integrated into Chinese science or mathematics.

The Mohist school of Chinese philosophy contained an approach to logic and argumentation that stresses  rhetorical analogies over mathematical reasoning, and is based on the three fa, or methods of drawing distinctions between kinds of things.

One of the schools that grew out of Mohism, the Logicians, are credited by some scholars for their early investigation of formal logic.

Daoist skepticism
Although Daoist skeptics such as Zhuang Zhou agreed with the Mohist perspective about object relations regarding similarities and differences, they did not consider language to be sufficiently precise to provide a constant guide of action.

The repression of the study of logic
During the subsequent Qin dynasty, the rule of Legalism repressed this Mohist line of investigation, which has been said to have disappeared in China until the introduction of Indian philosophy and Indian logic by Buddhists.  A prominent scholar suggests that the version assembled for the Imperial Library of the Han dynasty would probably have been as disorganised as the current extant text, and thus would have only been 'intermittently intelligible', as it is for current readers who do not consult a critical edition. Disagreeing with Hajime Nakamura, Graham argues the school of Neo-Taoism maintained some interest in the Canons, although they may already have some of the terminology difficult to understand.  Before the end of the Sui dynasty, a shortened version of Mozi appeared, which appears to have replaced the Han edition.  Although the original Mozi had been preserved in the Taoist, and became known once more in the 1552 Lu edition and 1553 Tang edition, the damage was done: the dialectical chapters (as well as the military chapters) were considered incomprehensible.  Nevertheless, with the rise of Chinese critical textual scholarship, the book benefited from explanatory and critical commentaries: first, by Bi Yuan, and his assistant, Sun Xingyan; another commentary by Wang Chong, which has not survived; 'the first special study', by Zhang Huiyan; a republication of Part B by Wu Rulun.  However, the summit of this late imperial scholarship, according to Graham, was the 'magnificent' commentary of Sun Yirang, which 'threw open the sanctum of the Canons to all comers.  Graham summarises the arduous textual history of the Canons by arguing that the Canons were neglected throughout most of China's history; but he attributes this fact to 'bibliographical' accidents, rather than political repression, like Nakamura.

Buddhist logic

The study of logic in China was revived following the transmission of Buddhism in China, which introduced the Buddhist logical tradition that began in Indian logic. Buddhist logic has been often misunderstood by scholars of Chinese Buddhism because they lack the necessary background in Indian logic.

Western logic

See also 

 Indian Logic

References

Bibliography
 Chmielewski, Janusz,  Notes on Early Chinese Logic,  Rocznik Orientalistyczny  26.1 (1962): 7-22; 26.2 (1963): 91–105; 27.1 (1963): 103–21; 28.2 (1965): 87–111; 29.2 (1965): 117–38; 30.1 (1966): 31–52; 31.1 (1968): 117–36; 32.2 (1969): 83–103.
 Chmielewski, Janusz, 2009. Language and Logic in Ancient China, Collected Papers on the Chinese Language and Logic, edited by Marek Mejor, Warswa: PAN.
 Graham, Angus Charles, 2003. Later Mohist Logic, Ethics and Science,  Hong Kong: Chinese University Press.
 Greniewski, Henryk and Wojtasiewicz, Olgierd, 1956.From the History of Chinese Logic, Studia Logica Vol. 4, 1, pp. 241–243.
 Harbsmeier, Christopher, 1998. Language and Logic.  Volume 7, Part 1 of Science and Civilisation in China, edited by Joseph Needham, Cambridge: Cambridge University Press.
 Hansen, Chad, 1983. Language and Logic in Ancient China.  Michigan Studies on China.  Ann Arbor.
 Kurtz, Joachim 2011. The Development of Chinese Logic, Leiden: Brill.
 Lucas, Thierry, 1993. Hui Shih and Kung Sun Lung: an Approach from Contemporary Logic, Journal of Chinese Philosophy 20.2: 211–55.
 Lucas, Thierry, 2005. Later Mohist Logic, Lei, Classes and Sorts, Journal of Chinese Philosophy 32: 349–366.
 Rošker, Jana S. 2014. Specific features of Chinese logic. Synthesis philosophica, ISSN 1848-2317. vol. 29, no. 1, pp. 23–40. 
 Rošker, Jana S. 2015. Classical Chinese logic, Philosophy Compass, ISSN 1747-9991, vol. 10, issue 5, pp. 301–309.

External links

Chad Hansen, Later Mohist Dialecticians
Raul Corazzon, Language and Logic in Ancient China with a bibliography on Chinese logic
Jana Rosker, Classical Chinese Logic
Synthesis philosophica, Vol.29 No.1, 2014 (with essays on Chinese logic)

History of logic
Chinese philosophy